The Brunswick City School District is a school district in Medina County, Ohio. It includes the following Brunswick, Ohio schools:

 Brunswick High School
 Applewood Elementary School
 Crestview Elementary School
 Hickory Ridge Elementary School
 Huntington Elementary School
 Kidder Elementary School
 Memorial Elementary School
 Towslee Elementary School
 Brunswick Middle school
Towslee Elementary School will close next school year.

External links
Brunswick City Schools official website

Education in Medina County, Ohio
School districts in Ohio